THOTCON is an American hacker conference that is organized by Nicholas Percoco, Matt Jakubowski, Jonathan Tomek, John Mocuta, David "VideoMan" Bryan, and several other OPERs (volunteers from the local DEF CON 312 chapter). It is held in Chicago, Illinois at a somewhat different top secret location each year.

The conference was historically held on a single day, but since 2015, it has grown in popularity, and now covers two days. Originally, the conference featured a single track of speakers presenting between ten and twelve talks on various information security and hacking topics. Currently, the conference offers multiple tracks including full-length talks, shorter 'TURBO' talks, longer workshops, and villages.

The name THOTCON is made of the first letter in the words that represent the main Chicago Area Code (312); as in THree-One-Two.

History 
 THOTCON 0x1 was held on April 23, 2010, at Joe's Bar.
The conference had approximately 235 attendees and 8 talks. It was also the very first hacker conference to be held in Chicago.
 THOTCON 0x2 was held on April 15, 2011, also at Joe's Bar in Chicago, IL. 
The conference had approximately 336 attendees and 12 talks.
 THOTCON 0x3 was held on April 27, 2012, at 4025 N Ravenswood, Chicago, IL.
 The conference had approximately 500 attendees and between 10 and 20 talks depending on the final venue configuration.
 THOTCON 0x4 was held on April 26, 2013, at 4025 N Ravenswood, Chicago, IL.
 The conference had approximately 700 attendees and featured 9 full-length talks, 9 shorter 'TURBO' talks and 3 workshops.
 THOTCON 0x5 was held on April 25, 2014, at 4025 N Ravenswood, Chicago, IL.
 THOTCON 0x6 was held on May 14–15, 2015, at 4025 N Ravenswood, Chicago, IL.
 THOTCON 0x7 was held on May 5–6, 2016, at 4025 N Ravenswood, Chicago, IL.
 THOTCON 0x9 was held on May 5–6, 2018, at 4626 N Knox Ave, Chicago, IL.
 THOTCON 0xA was held on May 3–4, 2019.
 THOTCON 0xB was held on October 8–9, 2021, at 4626 N Knox Ave, Chicago, IL.

THOTCON is produced by THOTCON Infinity NFP, a tax-exempt 501(c)(3) nonprofit organization.

Past Speakers 
Past speakers of THOTCON events have included:
 Bruce Schneier, an American cryptographer, computer security and privacy specialist, and writer.
 Jayson E. Street, author of "Dissecting the hack: The F0rb1dd3n Network"
 Rafal Los, author of the HP blog "Following the White Rabbit"
 Ryan Jones, star of the TV show Tiger Team (TV series)
 Dave Marcus, director of security research at McAfee
 G. Mark Hardy, president of National Security Corporation
 Samy Kamkar, a prolific American programmer, freelance security researcher, and hacker
 Cory Doctorow, a Canadian science fiction author, activist, journalist, blogger and Special Advisor to the Electronic Frontier Foundation
 Dustin Heywood (known as EvilMog), member of team hashcat  and Senior Hacker at IBM X-Force Red 
 int80 (David Martinjak) from Dual Core (hip hop duo)
 Richard Thieme, a former priest who became a commentator on technology and culture 
 Chris Valasek, a computer security researcher with Cruise Automation, a self-driving car startup owned by GM, and best known for his work in automotive security research.

References

External links 
 
 THOTCON Archives - Archives of the presentations from previous conferences.
 

Hacker conventions